The following is a list of villages in Rivne Oblast in Ukraine.

Berezne Raion (Березнівський район)

Demydivka Raion (Демидівський район)

Dubno Raion (Дубенський район)

Dubrovytsia Raion (Дубровицький район)

Hoshcha Raion (Гощанський район)

Korets Raion (Корецький район)

Kostopil Raion (Костопільський район)

Mlyniv Raion (Млинівський район)

Ostroh Raion (Острозький район)

Radyvyliv Raion (Радивилівський район)

Rivne Raion (Рівненський район)

Rokytne Raion (Рокитнівський район)

Sarny Raion (Сарненський район)

Volodymyrets Raion (Володимирецький район)

Zarichne Raion (Зарічненський район)

Zdolbuniv Raion (Здолбунівський район)    

Rivne